Museo Rufino Tamayo is a public contemporary art museum located in Mexico City's Chapultepec Park, that produces contemporary art exhibitions, using its collection of modern and contemporary art, as well as artworks from the collection of its founder, the artist Rufino Tamayo.

Collection 
The museum's collection is divided in two groups: the modern fund which was collected mostly by Olga and Rufino Tamayo, and a contemporary fund that was created in the 1990s and that has been expanded continuously thanks to the donations of artists that have exhibited in the museum and other commissioned artworks.

The modern collection is striking for the list of major artists represented in it: Pablo Picasso, Joan Miró, Francis Bacon, Jean Dubuffet, Fernand Léger, Wifredo Lam, Pierre Soulages, Frank Auerbach, Alexander Calder, Eduardo Chillida, Salvador Dalí, Max Ernst, Josep Guinovart, Barbara Hepworth, Hans Hartung, Willem de Kooning, Roy Lichtenstein, René Magritte, Manolo Millares, Robert Motherwell, Georgia O´Keeffe, Arnaldo Pomodoro, Mark Rothko, Antoni Tàpies, Joaquín Torres García, Victor Vasarely, Andy Warhol, among others.

See also
List of single-artist museums
Museo Rufino Tamayo, Oaxaca

References

External links 

 Museo Tamayo website

Museo Rufino Tamayo, Mexico City
Art museums and galleries in Mexico
Art museums established in 1981
Biographical museums in Mexico
Museo Rufino Tamayo
Museo Rufino Tamayo, Mexico City
Museo Rufino Tamayo
Contemporary art galleries in Mexico
Modern art museums
Museo Rufino Tamayo
Museums in Mexico City
Museo Rufino Tamayo
Museums devoted to one artist